The history of cricket in New Zealand dates back to 1832 as a mention in the diary of Archdeacon Henry Williams.

History of cricket in New Zealand to 1890
History of cricket in New Zealand from 1890–91 to 1918
History of cricket in New Zealand from 1918–19 to 1945
History of cricket in New Zealand from 1945–46 to 1970
History of cricket in New Zealand from 1970–71 to 2000
History of cricket in New Zealand from 2000–01

See also
Cricket in New Zealand

References

See also
 Sport in New Zealand
 History of New Zealand
 Cricket in New Zealand